Maxime Jean Roberto Leverbe (born 15 February 1997) is a French professional footballer who plays as a defender for  club Benevento, on loan from Pisa.

Club career
Leverbe made his Serie C debut for Olbia on 1 October 2017 in a game against Pro Piacenza.

On 31 January 2019, he joined Cagliari on loan until 30 June 2019.

On 3 July 2019, Leverbe signed with Serie B club Chievo.

On 5 August 2021, he joined Pisa. On 14 August, he made his debut for the club against Cagliari in a 3–1 loss in the Coppa Italia. He made his Serie B debut eight days later on 22 August 2021 in a 1–0 win over SPAL.

On 28 July 2022, Leverbe returned to Sampdoria on loan with an option to buy. He remained on the bench in Sampdoria's early season games, and on 1 September 2022, Sampdoria arranged a sub-loan to Benevento, with the consent of Pisa.

References

External links
 

1997 births
Living people
People from Villepinte, Seine-Saint-Denis
Footballers from Seine-Saint-Denis
French footballers
Association football defenders
U.C. Sampdoria players
Olbia Calcio 1905 players
Cagliari Calcio players
A.C. ChievoVerona players
Pisa S.C. players
Benevento Calcio players
Serie C players
Serie B players
French expatriate footballers
French expatriate sportspeople in Italy
Expatriate footballers in Italy